This is a list of submissions to the 85th Academy Awards for Best Foreign Language Film.  The Academy of Motion Picture Arts and Sciences (AMPAS) has invited the film industries of various countries to submit their best film for the Academy Award for Best Foreign Language Film every year since the award was created in 1956. The award is presented annually by the Academy to a feature-length motion picture produced outside the United States that contains primarily non-English dialogue. The Foreign Language Film Award Committee oversees the process and reviews all the submitted films. Nine shortlisted contenders will be revealed a week before the announcement of the Oscar nominations.

The submitted motion pictures must be first released theatrically in their respective countries between 1 October 2011, and 30 September 2012.

On 8 October 2012, the Academy announced the final list of eligible submissions, with a record number of 71 films. Nine finalists were announced in December 2012, which were shortlisted in January, with the final five nominees announced on 10 January 2013. The Austrian entry Amour directed by Michael Haneke was the eventual winner.

Kenya submitted its first film in the Foreign Language category with Nairobi Half Life. Cambodia made its first submission in 18 years (and its second overall) with Lost Loves.

Submissions

Notes 
  Bolivia's nominating body, the Asociación de Cineastas Bolivianos, proposed sending Jorge Sanjinés' Insurgentes to represent Bolivia, and invited the film's producers to assemble the necessary documents to enter the film in the race. However, citing time restraints, the film's representatives declined to participate. Bolivia had been absent the past two years in large part because no local films fully met all AMPAS requirements.
  Cuba confirmed that it would not submit a film.
  Iran's Academy confirmed their participation in the competition on 21 September 2012, noting however that they had considered boycotting the Oscars due to the Innocence of Muslims video on YouTube that originated in the United States, and planned to send a strongly worded letter to that effect. On 24 September, it was announced that Iran's official selection committee had selected A Cube of Sugar by Reza Mirkarimi as the official Iranian submission. On the same day, the head of Iran's government controlled cinema agency called for a boycott of the Oscars and Reuters reported that Iran's Culture and Islamic Guidance Minister Mohammad Hosseini had confirmed that Iran would boycott.
  Luxembourg announced that their national selection committee had met and decided not to send a film. The country last competed in 2009.

References

External links 
 Official website of the Academy Awards

2011 in film
2012 in film
85